Latiscopidae is an extinct family of Mesozoic Era amphibian Temnospondyli. It was first described in 1940 based on a fossil skull found in Texas.

References

Trematosaurs
Amphibian families